Billy Vernon Wynne (born July 31, 1943) is an American former professional baseball player. He played in Major League Baseball as a right-handed pitcher from  through  for the New York Mets, Chicago White Sox and California Angels.

Early life
Wynne was born in Williamston, North Carolina, the same hometown as Baseball Hall of Fame member Gaylord Perry. He graduated from Williamston High School and then attended Pfeiffer University in Misenheimer, North Carolina.

Baseball career
Wynne was signed by the New York Mets as an amateur free agent before the 1965 season. He made his major league debut at the age of 24 with the Mets on August 6, 1967. On December 15, 1967, the Mets traded Wynne along with Buddy Booker, Tommy Davis and Jack Fisher to the Chicago White Sox for Tommie Agee and Al Weis. Wynne won his first major league game at Milwaukee's County Stadium, but he didn't beat either the Braves or the Brewers. Pitching for the White Sox in a June 16, 1969, game in Milwaukee — the White Sox played a total of 20 "home games" in Milwaukee in 1968 and 1969 — Wynne defeated the Seattle Pilots, 8-3. After a campaign in which he was the winning pitcher only once in 12 appearances, he was dealt along with Ken Berry and Syd O'Brien from the White Sox to the Angels for Jay Johnstone, Tom Egan and Tom Bradley on November 30, 1970. He played in his final major league game with the Angels on April 30, 1971 at the age of 27. He retired with a career MLB record of 8–11 with a 4.33 ERA.

References

Sources

.

1943 births
Living people
Auburn Mets players
American expatriate baseball players in Mexico
Baseball players from North Carolina
California Angels players
Chicago White Sox players
Florida Instructional League Mets players
Florida Instructional League White Sox players
Greenville Mets players
Hawaii Islanders players
Jacksonville Suns players
Major League Baseball pitchers
Marion Mets players
Mexican League baseball pitchers
New York Mets players
Pfeiffer Falcons baseball players
Peninsula Whips players
People from Williamston, North Carolina
Rojos del Águila de Veracruz players
Salt Lake City Angels players
Saraperos de Saltillo players
Tigres de Aragua players
American expatriate baseball players in Venezuela
Tucson Toros players
West Palm Beach Expos players